Francisco Roberto Flores Zapata (born 2 April 1988) is a footballer who plays as a left back for A.D.R. Jicaral. Capped once in a friendly by the Costa Rica national team, Flores represents the Nicaragua national team.

International career
Flores was born in Costa Rican to a Nicaraguan father and Costa Rican mother. He made one friendly appearance for the Costa Rica national team in 2015, before switching to represent Nicaragua.

References

External links
 

1988 births
Living people
People with acquired Nicaraguan citizenship
Nicaraguan men's footballers
Nicaragua international footballers
Costa Rica international footballers
Costa Rican footballers
Nicaraguan people of Costa Rican descent
Costa Rican people of Nicaraguan descent
Association football fullbacks
Association football midfielders
Dual internationalists (football)
A Lyga players
FC Stumbras players
Nicaraguan expatriate footballers
Nicaraguan expatriate sportspeople in Lithuania
Expatriate footballers in Lithuania
People from Guanacaste Province
Liga FPD players
Municipal Liberia footballers
Puntarenas F.C. players
L.D. Alajuelense footballers
Municipal Pérez Zeledón footballers
Santos de Guápiles footballers
A.D.R. Jicaral players
Costa Rican expatriate footballers
Costa Rican expatriate sportspeople in Lithuania
2019 CONCACAF Gold Cup players